Austromitra rhodarion is a species of small sea snail, marine gastropod mollusk in the family Costellariidae, the ribbed miters.

References

rhodarion
Gastropods described in 1972